Anthony Whyte may refer:

 Anthony Whyte (soccer), Canadian-born Guyanese soccer player
 Anthony Whyte (writer), American author

See also
Anthony White (disambiguation), for people with the name Anthony White